Ginjo Thakurgaon is a village situated in the northern region of the Ranchi district (Burmu block) in Jharkhand. It is about 25 km north-west of Ranchi, the capital city of Jharkhand. The village is bounded by Mandar, Burmu, Pithauria, Chund and Ratu.

Monday and Thursday each weekly haat or market in Ginjo Thakurgaon where people come from different villages and shopping. Otherwise, the main vegetable market are Brambe and Makhmandro (Katulahna) for the farmer where they can sell their own vegetable.

Forest Research Center at Mandar and Patratu Thermal Power Station at Patratu, Hazaribagh are within a short distance.

Geography

Places of interest

Bhawani Shankar Mandir

Schools

Communication

References

Cities and towns in Ranchi district